Vuurman is a surname. Notable people with the surname include:

Tieleman Vuurman (1899–1991), Dutch sport shooter and Olympian, son of Uilke
Uilke Vuurman (1872–1955), Dutch sport shooter and Olympian, father of Tieleman

Surnames of Dutch origin